Woke is an adjective meaning 'aware of issues concerning social and racial justice'.

Woke or WOKE may also refer to:

Arts and entertainment
 Woke (TV series), a comedy TV series on Hulu
 Woke: A Guide to Social Justice, a book by Andrew Doyle under the pseudonym Titania McGrath
 Woke, Inc.: Inside Corporate America's Social Justice Scam, a book by Vivek Ramaswamy

Broadcasting
 WOKE-LP, a low-power radio station (94.9 FM) licensed to serve Fort Myers, Florida, United States; see List of radio stations in Florida
 WKSG (FM) (98.3 FM), licensed to serve Garrison, Kentucky, United States, which held the call sign WOKE from 1997 to 2018
 WQSC (1340 AM), licensed to serve Charleston, South Carolina, United States, which held the call sign WOKE from 1958 to 1994

Other uses
 Emperor Kenzō of Japan, previously known as Prince Woke

See also